Michigan's 20th House of Representatives district (also referred to as Michigan's 20th House district) is a legislative district within the Michigan House of Representatives anchored in the central Oakland County community of West Bloomfield Township, alongside the cities of Orchard Lake, Keego Harbor, Sylvan Lake, and parts of Commerce and Bloomfield townships.

List of representatives

Recent Elections

Historical district boundaries

Notes

References 

Michigan House of Representatives districts
Government of Detroit
Wayne County, Michigan